Sibylle of Jülich-Cleves-Berg, Margravine of Burgau (26 August 1557 in Cleves – 1628 in Günzburg) was the daughter of Duke William the Rich and his second wife, Archduchess Maria of Austria.

Her brother John William inherited the United Duchies of Jülich-Cleves-Berg in 1592.  After he had developed a mental illness, a power struggle broke out at court between Sibylle and her sister-in-law Jakobea of Baden.  Sibylle won, and imprisoned Jakobea.  Sibylle may also have been partially responsible for Jakobea's violent death in 1597.

In 1601, Sibylle married Margrave Charles of Burgau.  In 1610, the couple moved into the residence at Günzburg.  Here, she entertained a feudal court, even after her husband died in 1618.  She acted in particular as patron of music.

Sibylle died in 1628 and was buried next to her husband in the Capuchin Church in Günzburg.  When the church was demolished, her remains were transferred to the St. Martin's Church, also in Günzburg.

References 
 Hans Frei und Barbara Beck (ed.): Lebensbilder. Geschichte und Kunst in Bildnissen aus Schwaben, Oberschönenfeld, 2002, p. 170

External links 

 Women in power

Footnotes 

German duchesses
House of La Marck
1557 births
1628 deaths
Margravines of Germany
16th-century German people
17th-century German people